708 Naval Air Squadron (708 NAS) was a Naval Air Squadron of the Royal Navy's Fleet Air Arm.

References

Citations

Bibliography

700 series Fleet Air Arm squadrons
Military units and formations established in 1941
Air squadrons of the Royal Navy in World War II